Cochlear, the adjective form of cochlea, may refer to:

 Cochlear implant, a sensory aid for the deaf
 Cochlear nuclei, the ventral cochlear nucleus and the dorsal (or lateral) cochlear nucleus
 Vestibular-cochlear or Vestibulocochlear nerve, the eighth cranial nerve
 Cochlear nerve, a division of the eighth cranial nerve
 Cochlear aqueduct, or aqueduct of cochlea, a communication between the perilymphatic space and the subarachnoid space
 Cochlear artery, a division of the internal auditory artery
 Cochlea, part of the Labyrinth (inner ear)
 Cochlear duct, also known as the scala media, the endolymph-filled part of the cochlea
 Cochlear, an alternate term for the spoon (liturgy) used in the Eastern Orthodox Church in serving the sacramental wine, sometimes with a particle of the sacramental bread
 The spoon-like tip of the scape found on the epigyne of some female spiders
 Cochlear Limited, manufacturer of Nucleus Cochlear Implant
 Cochlear Bone Anchored Solutions, manufacturer of Baha bone anchored hearing aid